Practical Motorist was a British car magazine founded on 12 May 1934 (as The Practical Motorist) by George Newnes Ltd. Its emphasis was on DIY car maintenance supplemented with more general motoring topics. Initially it was a weekly magazine until publication was suspended in 1940. It was relaunched as a monthly in 1954, retitled Practical Motorist & Motor Cyclist, reverting to Practical Motorist in 1959. Publication ceased in 1997.

References

Automobile magazines published in the United Kingdom
Defunct magazines published in the United Kingdom
Magazines established in 1934
Magazines disestablished in 1997
George Newnes Ltd magazines